841 Arabella is an asteroid belonging to the Flora family in the Main Belt. Its rotation period is 3.39 hours. It is named after the title character from Richard Strauss' opera Arabella.

References

External links 
 
 

000841
Discoveries by Max Wolf
Named minor planets
19161001